Karukkakottai is a village in the Orathanadu taluk of Thanjavur district, Tamil Nadu, India.

Demographics 

As per the 2001 census, Karukkakottai had a total population of 1080 with 534 males and 546 females. The sex ratio was 1022. The literacy rate was 58.21.

References 

 

Villages in Thanjavur district